Käthe Itter (1907–1992) was a German film, television and stage actress.

Filmography

References

Bibliography
 Greco, Joseph. The File on Robert Siodmak in Hollywood, 1941–1951. Universal-Publishers, 1999.

External links

1907 births
1992 deaths
German film actresses
People from Spandau